Letterlike Symbols is a Unicode block containing 80 characters which are constructed mainly from the glyphs of one or more letters. In addition to this block, Unicode includes full styled mathematical alphabets, although Unicode does not explicitly categorise these characters as being "letterlike".

Symbols

Glyph variants
Variation selectors may be used to specify chancery (U+FE00) vs roundhand (U+FE01) forms, if the font supports them:

The remainder of the set is at Mathematical Alphanumeric Symbols.

Block

Emoji
The Letterlike Symbols block contains two emoji:
U+2122 and U+2139.

The block has four standardized variants defined to specify emoji-style (U+FE0F VS16) or text presentation (U+FE0E VS15) for the
two emoji, both of which default to a text presentation.

History
The following Unicode-related documents record the purpose and process of defining specific characters in the Letterlike Symbols block:

See also 
 Greek in Unicode 
 Latin script in Unicode 
 Unicode symbols 
 Mathematical operators and symbols in Unicode 
 Mathematical Alphanumeric Symbols (Unicode block) 
 Currency Symbols (Unicode block)

References

Unicode blocks
Typographical symbols